Rangmahal is a village in North Guwahati, Kamrup rural district, situated in north bank of river Brahmaputra.

Transport
The village is near National Highway 31, and connected to nearby towns and cities with regular buses and other modes of transportation.

See also
 Rani
 Rampur

References

Villages in Kamrup district